McKenzie River may refer to:
 McKenzie River (Oregon), in Oregon, United States
 McKenzie River (Victoria), in south-eastern Victoria, Australia, a tributary of the Bemm River
 McKenzie River (Bécancour River tributary), in the Bécancour watershed, in Quebec, in Canada

See also 
 Mackenzie River (disambiguation)